Frances Curran (born 21 May 1961) is a former co-chair of the Scottish Socialist Party.  She was a Member of the Scottish Parliament (MSP) for the West of Scotland region from 2003 to 2007.

Political career
A former member of the Labour Party and an organiser for the entryist Militant group, Curran became a high-profile figure in Scottish left politics on her election to the Scottish Parliament as a Scottish Socialist Party MSP in 2003. She had joined the SSP on its formation in 1998, and brought political experience she had gained while she served as the youth representative on Labour's National Executive Committee.

In July 2005, Curran played a role in organising the protest outside Gleneagles at the 2005 G8 Summit. The previous week, she and other SSP MSPs took part in a protest within the Scottish Parliament, which led to them being suspended for the month of September and fined £30,000. This protest was due to their claim that the First Minister had gone back on his word that the parliament would support the rally outside the Perthshire hotel.

Curran was the public face of the SSP's campaign for the provision of nutritious free school meals, which they said would tackle ill health and poor diet in Scottish schoolchildren. Her campaign drew a wide base of support from a number of children's and health charities. As part of the Save Our Services campaign, she was involved in community occupations to stop the closure of a school and community centre. In 2007, she was arrested but not charged at an anti-nuclear protest at Faslane as part of the Faslane 365 campaign.

She was an unsuccessful candidate in the July 2008 Glasgow East by-election. During the campaign, she was informed that the police had received death threats against her.

She stood again as a candidate on the Glasgow regional list for the Holyrood election in 2011, but failed to be elected. She had stepped down as the party's national co-spokesperson less than a month before the election.

Curran was elected to the SSP's Executive Committee in 2012 but stood down again in 2013, keeping a low profile throughout the party's referendum campaign. She was elected as party co-chair alongside Bill Bonnar at the 2014 conference, but withdrew her nomination for the position on the day of the 2015 conference seven months later.  She was re-elected to the SSP executive at its 2016 conference.

At the 2018 conference she stood for national spokesperson, but lost to Róisín McLaren.  She remains an ordinary member of the executive committee.

References

External links 
 

1961 births
Living people
Scottish Socialist Party national spokespersons
Politicians from Glasgow
Scottish Trotskyists
Scottish Socialist Party MSPs
Militant tendency supporters
Female members of the Scottish Parliament
Members of the Scottish Parliament 2003–2007